Rippon Glacier is a small glacier located in Kemp Land, East Antarctica. It is close east of Seaton Glacier, flowing southward into Edward VIII Ice Shelf.

Discovery and naming
Rippon Glacier was mapped from aerial photos taken by ANARE (Australian National Antarctic Research Expeditions) in 1956, and named for Sgt. Ralph Tudor Rippon, RAAF, airframe fitter at Mawson Station in 1959.

Weather conditions
Just to the south of Rippon Glacier is a large valley formed by the Robert and Wilma Glaciers. These two glaciers, along with the Seaton and Rippon Glaciers, all flow into the King Edward Ice Shelf. To the west are the Napier Mountains, running northwest from Mount Elkins. Still further west are the Tula Mountains, beyond which the Beaver Glacier flows into Amundsen Bay. Collectively, these terrain features significantly modify weather produced by synoptic scale systems. Dramatic changes can occur over short distances and in short time intervals. One problem with some moist southeasterly airstreams is cloud formation northwest of Seaton and Rippon Glaciers that produces whiteout conditions looking inland of Rippon Depot.

Flora
The following species have been sighted within 1.0 degrees of Rippon Glacier:

Fungi
Buellia frigida
Caloplaca athallina
Caloplaca citrina
Candelariella flava
Japewia tornoensis
Lecanora expectans
Physcia caesia
Physcia dubia
Pseudephebe minuscula
Rinodina olivaceobrunnea
Xanthoria mawsonii

Fauna
The following species have been sighted within 1.0 degrees of Rippon Glacier:

See also
 Enderby Land
 List of glaciers in the Antarctic
 Glaciology

References

External links
 Australian Antarctic Division
 Australian Antarctic Gazetteer
 Australian Antarctic Names and Medals Committee (AANMC)
 United States Geological Survey, Geographic Names Information System (GNIS)
 Scientific Committee on Antarctic Research (SCAR)
 Composite Gazetteer of Antarctica
 PDF Map of the Australian Antarctic Territory
 Mawson Station
 ANARE Club
 List of Peaks in Enderby Land
 Click here to see an image of helicopters refueling at a temporary fuel depot on Rippon Glacier in December 1979.

Glaciers of Kemp Land